In Greek mythology, Iamus (Ancient Greek: Ἴαμος) was the son of Apollo and Evadne, a daughter of Poseidon, raised by Aepytus.

Mythology 
Evadne loved Apollo and by him she became pregnant, but was shamed by Aepytus for her pregnancy. When it was time for the childbirth, Apollo sent down Eileithyia and the Moirai (Fates) to assist Evadne. After giving birth, she unwillingly abandoned the child in the wild and returned. The child survived, as he was nourished by some honeybees sent by Apollo, or the Fates. When Aepytus learnt from the Delphic Oracle that the new born was sired by Apollo himself and was destined to be a great prophet, he ordered to bring the child back into the house. The infant was found alive lying among violets, and was named Iamus (from ίον, "violet") by Evadne.

When he reached his youth, Iamus descended into the waters of Alpheios and invoked Poseidon, his grandfather, and Apollo, his father, asking them to reveal his destiny to him. Only Apollo answered his prayer, and appearing to him, took him to Olympia. There, Apollo taught him the art of prophecy and gave him the power to understand and explain the voices of birds. Iamus later founded the Iamidae, a family of priests from Olympia.

Notes

References 
 Pausanias, Description of Greece with an English Translation by W.H.S. Jones, Litt.D., and H.A. Ormerod, M.A., in 4 Volumes. Cambridge, MA, Harvard University Press; London, William Heinemann Ltd. 1918. . Online version at the Perseus Digital Library
Pausanias, Graeciae Descriptio. 3 vols. Leipzig, Teubner. 1903.  Greek text available at the Perseus Digital Library.
Pindar, Odes translated by Diane Arnson Svarlien. 1990. Online version at the Perseus Digital Library.
Pindar, The Odes of Pindar including the Principal Fragments with an Introduction and an English Translation by Sir John Sandys, Litt.D., FBA. Cambridge, MA., Harvard University Press; London, William Heinemann Ltd. 1937. Greek text available at the Perseus Digital Library.
 

Mythological Greek seers
Children of Apollo
Demigods in classical mythology

Elean mythology